The Locarno Film Festival is an annual film festival, held every August in Locarno, Switzerland. Founded in 1946, the festival screens films in various competitive and non-competitive sections, including feature-length narrative, documentary, short, avant-garde, and retrospective programs. The Piazza Grande section is held in an open-air venue that seats 8,000 spectators.

The top prize of the festival is the Golden Leopard, awarded to the best film in the International Competition. Other awards include the Leopard of Honour for career achievement, and the Prix du Public, the public choice award.

History
The Festival del film Locarno kicked off on 23 August 1946, at the Grand Hotel of Locarno with the screening of the movie O sole mio by Giacomo Gentilomo. The first edition was organized in less than three months with a line-up of fifteen movies, mainly American and Italian, among which was Rome, Open City directed by Roberto Rossellini, And Then There Were None directed by René Clair (1945), Double Indemnity by Billy Wilder (1944) and The Song of Bernadette by Henry King (1943).
Later, the Festival del film Locarno presented features and short films by many international directors such as Claude Chabrol, Stanley Kubrick, Paul Verhoeven, Miloš Forman, Marco Bellocchio, Glauber Rocha, Raúl Ruiz, Alain Tanner, Mike Leigh, Béla Tarr, Chen Kaige, Edward Yang, Alexandr Sokurov, Atom Egoyan, Jim Jarmusch, Ang Lee, Gregg Araki, Christoph Schaub, Catherine Breillat, Abbas Kiarostami, Gus Van Sant, Pedro Costa, Fatih Akin, Claire Denis and Kim Ki-Duk.

The 73rd edition, scheduled from 5 to 15 August 2020, was cancelled due to the COVID-19 pandemic, it was cancelled for the first time since World War II; in its place, the special edition called "Locarno 2020 - For the Future of Films" was held. The festival had asked high-profile directors including Lucrecia Martel and Lav Diaz to select films from the festival's 74-year history for a retrospective that was screened online and in physical locations.

The 74th Locarno Film Festival took place from 4 to 14 August 2021. Over 75,000 people attended.

The 75th Locarno Film Festival took place from 3 to 13 August 2022. It opened with Brad Pitt's film Bullet Train.

Awards

Competitive Awards

Concorso internazionale (international competition) - Awards
 Pardo d'oro (Golden Leopard). Grand Prize of the festival, awarded by the city and region of Locarno, for the best film in the concorso internazionale (international competition).
 Special Jury Prize. Prize, awarded by cities of Ascona and Losone, for the second best film in the concorso internazionale (international competition).
 Leopard for Best Direction. Prize, awarded by the city and region of Locarno, for the best directed film in the concorso internazionale (international competition).
 Leopard for Best Actress. 
 Leopard for Best Actor. 
 Swatch First Feature Awards. Prize awarded by a jury of international critics to the first works presented in the sections concorso internazionale, concorso Cineasti del presente, Fuori concorso, Moving ahead (ex Signs of Life) and Piazza Grande.

Concorso Cineasti del Presente (Filmmakers of the Present) - Awards
 Pardo d'oro Cineasti del presente (Golden Leopard - Filmmakers of the Present). Prize awarded to the best film of this competition, which is dedicated to first or second features.
 Ciné+ Special Jury Prize – Cineasti del presente. The French television channel Ciné+ Club offers the broadcast rights to the winning film and guarantees the broadcast on their channel. 
 Pardo per il miglior regista emergente (Leopard for Best New Director): Prize for the best new director. 
  Pardo per la migliore opera prima (Leopard for the Best First Feature). Prize which has been awarded from 2006 to 2009 to the best first work screened in the competition concorso internazionale or concorso Cineasti del presente.

Pardi di domani (Leopards of Tomorrow) - Awards
 Pardino d'oro for the Best International Short Film – SRG SSR Prize. Prize awarded to the best short film in the international short film competition Pardi di domani. 
 Pardino d'oro for the Best Swiss Short Film – Swiss Life Prize. Prize awarded to the best short film in the national short film competition Pardi di domani. 
 Pardino d'argento SSR SRG for the international competition. Prize awarded to a film in the international competition Pardi di domani.
 Pardino d'argento Swiss Life for the national competition. Prize awarded to a film in the national competition Pardi di domani.
 Locarno short film nominee for the European Film Awards – Pianifica Prize. The prize, which is offered by the studio Pianifica, goes to a short film made by a European director, presented in one of the two competitions. The award includes an automatic nomination in the short film category of the European Film Awards. 
 Prize for Best Swiss Newcomer. The prize provides equipment offered by Cinegrell, Visuals SA, Freestudios SA, Taurus Studio e Avant-première SA/Film Demnächst AG. 
 Premio Medien Patent Verwaltung AG. The winning film will be subtitled in three central European languages. This subtitling can be inserted on film, video or DVD format.

 Green Pardo WWF In collaboration with WWF, the Green Pardo WWF is the prize that aims to find the film which best reflects the environmental theme in any of the Festival’s competition sections.

Direction and management
Artistic Directors:
 1946–1958: Riccardo Bolla
 1960–1965: Vinicio Beretta
 1966: Sandro Bianconi
 1967–1970: Sandro Bianconi, Freddy Buache
 1971: Commission of direction, composed of seven members from Ticino
 1972–1977: Moritz de Hadeln
 1978–1981: Jean-Pierre Brossard
 1982–1991: David Streiff
 1992–2000: Marco Müller
 2000–2005: Irene Bignardi
 2005–2009: Frédéric Maire
 2010–2012: Olivier Père
 2012–2018: Carlo Chatrian
 2018–2020: Lili Hinstin
2020: Nadia Dresti (ad interim)
 2021–: Giona A. Nazzaro
Presidents:
 1946–1955: Camillo Beretta
 1957–1962: Enrico Franzioni
 1963–1968: Fernando Gaja
 1970–1980: Luciano Giudici
 1981–1999: Raimondo Rezzonico
 Since 2000: Marco Solari
Chief Operating Officers:
 2006–2013: Marco Cacciamognaga
 2013–2017: Mario Timbal
 Since August 2017: Raphaël Brunschwig (Managing Director since 2022)

Gallery

See also
 List of film festivals
 List of film festivals in Europe
 List of film awards

References

External links
 Festival del film Locarno Official Site (in English and Italian)
 Festival del film Locarno at Internet Movie Database

Film festivals in Switzerland
1946 establishments in Switzerland
Film festivals established in 1946
Tourist attractions in Ticino
Locarno Festival